The 2021–22 season was the 113th season in the existence of Borussia Dortmund and the club's 46th consecutive season in the top flight of German football. In addition to the domestic league, Borussia Dortmund participated in this season's editions of the DFB-Pokal, the UEFA Champions League and the UEFA Europa League, as well as the DFL-Supercup as winners of the 2020–21 DFB-Pokal.

The season was the first since 2009–10 without Łukasz Piszczek, who departed to LKS Goczałkowice-Zdrój.

Players

First-team squad

Out on loan

Transfers

In

Out

Kits

Pre-season and friendlies

Competitions

Overall record

Bundesliga

League table

Results summary

Results by round

Matches
The league fixtures were announced on 25 June 2021.

DFB-Pokal

DFL-Supercup

UEFA Champions League

Group stage

The draw for the group stage was held on 26 August 2021.

UEFA Europa League

Knockout phase

Knockout round play-offs
The knockout round play-offs draw was held on 13 December 2021.

Statistics

Appearances and goals

|-
! colspan=16 style=background:#dcdcdc; text-align:center| Goalkeepers

 

|-
! colspan=16 style=background:#dcdcdc; text-align:center| Defenders

|-
! colspan=16 style=background:#dcdcdc; text-align:center| Midfielders
    

 
 
 

 

|-
! colspan=16 style=background:#dcdcdc; text-align:center| Forwards

 

|-
! colspan=16 style=background:#dcdcdc; text-align:center| Players transferred out during the season

Goalscorers

Last updated: 14 May 2022

References

Borussia Dortmund seasons
Borussia Dortmund
Borussia Dortmund
Borussia Dortmund